The elm cultivar Ulmus minor 'Bea Schwarz' was cloned (as No. 62) at Wageningen in the Netherlands, by the elm disease committee, from a selection of Ulmus minor found in France in 1939.  However, specimens of the tree grown in the UK and the United States are falsely treated as Ulmus × hollandica (after Fontaine ).

Description
The tree is considered of poor growth and shape if grafted on U. × hollandica rootstock.
Nowadays it is sparsely grown on its own rootstock.

Pests and diseases
Not resistant to the second, more virulent, strain of Dutch elm disease, (O. novo-ulmi), but more resistant to Coral Spot fungus Nectria cinnabarina than its forebear 'Christine Buisman'.

Cultivation
Commercial production was discontinued in the Netherlands soon after its release in 1948. Nevertheless, its moderate resistance to Dutch elm disease saw it, or its selfed progeny, successfully used in later Dutch hybridizations, notably 'Nanguen' = . 'Bea Schwarz' was later propagated and marketed in the UK by the Hillier & Sons nursery, Winchester, Hampshire from 1967 to 1977, when production ceased with the advent of the more virulent form of Dutch elm disease.

Notable trees
The largest known examples in the UK grow along Crespin Way, Hollingdean, Brighton; planted in 1964, they measured 19 m high by 50 cm d.b.h. in 2009.

Hybrid cultivars
 'Nanguen' = , 'Clusius', 'Lobel', (all from crossings with 'Bea Schwarz' selfed), Ulmus minor 'Amsterdam', formally known as Ulmus 'Amsterdam' (from an open pollination?).

Etymology
The tree is named for Bea Schwarz, the Dutch phytopathologist who identified the Asian fungus known as Dutch elm disease in the 1920s.

Accessions

North America
 Arnold Arboretum, US. Acc. nos. 151–61, 276–62
 Holden Arboretum, US. Acc. no. 57–1243
 Longwood Gardens, US. Acc. no. 1967–0876

Europe
 Brighton & Hove City Council, UK. NCCPG Elm Collection.
Grange Farm Arboretum, Lincolnshire, UK. Acc. no. 1275
Netherlands Plant Collection Ulmus, Wijdemeren, North Holland, Netherlands, planted on its own rootstock 2019, Location Dennenlaan, Loosdrecht

Nurseries

Europe
 Noordplant , Glimmen, Netherlands.

References

External links
  Sheet labelled Ulmus 'Bea Schwarz', Baarn, 1948
  Sheet labelled Ulmus 'Bea Schwarz', Baarn, 1949
"Herbarium specimen DOV0038308". Delaware State University, Claude E. Phillips Herbarium. Sheet labelled U. × hollandica 'Bea Schwarz'; leaves specimen
 "Herbarium specimen DOV0038308". Delaware State University, Claude E. Phillips Herbarium. Sheet labelled U. × hollandica 'Bea Schwarz'; flowers specimen

Field elm cultivar
Ulmus articles with images
Ulmus